Sporting Vereniging Notch is a Surinamese football club based in Moengo, Marowijne. The club presently competes in the Surinamese Hoofdklasse, the top tier of Surinamese football. Notch earned promotion into the Hoofdklasse after winning the Surinamese Eerste Klasse, the second tier of Surinamese football. The club kit manufacturer is Jako.

Players

Current squad 
Squad for the 2022 SVB Eerste Divisie

Notable Coaches 
 Joël Martinus 
 Roy Vanenburg 
 João Duarte Andrade

Honours 
SVB Eerste Klasse: 1
 2010–11

Beker van Suriname: 1
 2011

Performance in CONCACAF competitions 
2014 CFU Club Championship
Withdrew

2016 CFU Club Championship
First round v.  Atlético Pantoja – 0:3
First round v.  Arnett Gardens – 4:8
First round v.  America des Cayes – 0:1

References

External links 

 
Football clubs in Moengo
Football clubs in Suriname
Association football clubs established in 2003